The Kyiv National Economic University is a self-governing public university in Kyiv, Ukraine. The university was founded in 1906 as Higher commercial courses.

It was ranked #3 by the Ukrainian national ranking of the universities conducted by Compass in 2012. According to one of the leading university rankings in the world (Eduniversal, 2015), KNEU occupied the second position among universities in Ukraine. In 2020, in the same ranking, it took the third place among Ukrainian universities.

In 2005, the university was named in honor of  Vadym Hetman, a prominent Ukrainian banker, economist, and the founder of the National Bank of Ukraine.

History of formation and development 

 1906 — Kyiv Higher Commercial Courses
 1908 — Kyiv Commercial Institute
 1920 — Kyiv Institute of National Economy (KINE)
 1934 — Kyiv Financial and Economic Institute
 1960 — Kyiv Institute of National Economy (KINE)
 1992 — Kyiv State Economic University
 1997 — Kyiv National University of Economics
 2005 — Kyiv National Economic University named after Vadym Hetman
 2010-2014 — State Higher Educational Institution Kyiv National Economic University named after Vadym Hetman — a self-governing (autonomous) research university

General information
The Kyiv National Economic University is the largest economic educational institution in Ukraine. It is recognized in Ukraine and in the world as a training center for economists, managers and lawyers.

The area of the university is 118,765 m² or 9.4 m² per student. Classroom foundation includes audiences for lectures, rooms for seminars and workshops, computer classes and more. The total area of fund classroom is 14,332.7 m². The university also has 6709 m² gyms area and own the stadium and 6 hostels. The number of students in Kyiv National Economic University is approximately 15,000.

The mission of the university is to make a significant contribution to social development through research, generation of new knowledge, their dissemination and training of competitive professionals and creative individuals.

Bachelor programs
 Law;
 Economic theory;
 Economic cybernetics; ;
 International economics;
 Business economics;
 Economy of agroindustrial complex;
 Personnel management and labour economics;
 Applied statistics;
 Marketing;
 Finance and credit;
 Finance and credit – specialization Banking (Credit);
 Accounting in agroindustrial complex;
 Management;
 Computer sciences.

Divisions
 Student Tourist Club "Skify"
 Center of master's training
 Center of international relations
 Foreign citizens teaching division
 Department of science and postgraduate studies
 Ukrainian institute of stock market development
 Educational an methodical department
 Institute of higher education
 Primary trade-union organization of students and post-graduate students
 Student academic council
 Scientific student community
 Students’ employment center “Perspective”
 Library
 Publishing house
 Sport center “Economist”
 Culture and arts center
 Campus
 Preventive medicine sanatorium

International organizations and programs
Kyiv National Economic University is a member of the following international organizations and programs:
 EDAMBA – 
 EPLO – 
 EFMD – 
 BSUN – 
 
 TEMPUS – 
 RSA – 
 EAC – 
 
 CES - 
 the Ukrainian Bar Association Students League -

Campuses and buildings
 Main building of KNEU
 Building # 2, 3, 5, 6, 7 of KNEU
 Library
 Dormitories: I, II, III, IV, V, VI
 Sport Complex “Economist”
 Publishing house
 Preventive medicine sanatorium

Institutes and faculties

Institutes
 Educational and research institute of economic development (1997)
 Ukrainian institute of stock market development (1997)
 Institute of higher education (2009)
 Institute of financial controlling (2009)
 Institute of encyclopedic research in economics (2009)
 Institute of global economic policy (2009)
 Institute of credit relations (2009)
 French-Ukrainian institute of management (2010)
 Institute of economics and management of agroindustrial complex (2010)
 Institute of financial and economic research (2010)
 Institute of modeling and informational systems in economics (2010)
 Institute of accounting (2010)
 Institute of socio-economic relations (2010)
 Institute of legal research and law project work (2010)
 Institute of marketing (2011)
 Institute of innovative entrepreneurship (2011)

Faculties
 Economics and Management (1945)
 International Economics and Management (1992)
 Law (1993)
 Personnel Management and Marketing (1965)
 Accounting (1959)
 Economics of Agro-Industrial Industry (1945)
 Finance (1906)
 Crediting (2003)
 Informational Systems and Technology (1964)

Colleges 

 KNEU College of Economics and Management
 KNEU College of Economics in Kyiv 
 KNEU College of Information Systems and Technologies Kyiv
 Simferopol College of KNEU
 Romensky College of Economics of KNEU

National rankings

National rankings 
 Compass-2012 Rankings of Ukrainian universities:
 in Overall Ranking – 3rd place;
 in a Ranking by Subject «Business & Economics» –  2nd place;
 in a Ranking of Universities in Central Region of Ukraine – 3rd place;
 University Ranking «TOP-200 Ukraine», 2011/2012:
 in Overall Ranking – 10th place;
 among economic universities – 1st place;
 Ranking by newspaper «Comments» - Ranking of Universities graduates of which are most wanted on the market, 2012. – 3rd place;
 University Ranking by magazine «Dengi» (Money), 2012 :
 Ranking in «Economics» – 2nd place;
 Ranking in «Law» – 6th place;

International rankings
 Eduniversal Ranking - «3 Palmes – EXCELLENT Business Schools nationally strong and/or with continental links»;
 Eduniversal Best Masters ranking Eastern Europe:
 Information Systems Management (Master in Information Systems in Management) - 4th place;
 Engineering and Project Management (Master in Project Management and Consulting) – 6th place;
 Accounting and Auditing (Master in Accounting and Auditing in Management of Business Enterprises) – 7th place;
 Public Administration / Management (Master in Public Service) - 7th place;
 General Management (Master in Management of Enterprises) – 9th place;
 Marketing (Master in Marketing Management) - 9th place;
 International Management (Master in Management of International Business) – 19th place;
 Corporate Finance (Master in Financial Management) – 20th place;
 Insurance (Master in Insurance Management) - 47th place;

Notable alumni
 Volodymyr Zelenskyy, 6th President of Ukraine
 Victoria Spartz (née Вікторія Кульгейко), American businesswoman who is a member of the United States House of Representatives
 Olena Derevianko, Ukrainian academic, Professor of Social Communications

References

External links

 Official site
 Best universities of Ukraine: Kompas ranking
 Official facebook page
KNEU Publishing

 
Universities and colleges in Kyiv
Prospect Beresteiskyi
National universities in Ukraine
Government-owned companies of Ukraine
Institutions with the title of National in Ukraine